Chihi is a surname. Notable people with the surname include:

Adil Chihi (born 1988), German-born Moroccan footballer
Bibya Chihi (born 1952), Tunisian politician
, Tunisian actress
Sirajeddine Chihi (born 1970), Tunisian footballer